Andreas Andersson (born 27 February 1991) is a Swedish footballer who plays for Sundsvall.

Career

Club career
Andersson started at  Gerdskens BK, before joining IF Elfsborg in 2008. In March 2011, Andersson was loaned out to Division 1 club FC Trollhättan. After only two matches at the club, Andersson was recalled to Elfsborg after Jesper Christiansen injured himself. In February 2013, Andersson was loaned out to Ljungskile SK.

In December 2013, Andersson joined IK Sirius, where he signed a two-year contract. After two years as first goalkeeper in Sirius, Andersson moved to Gefle IF in November 2015, where he signed a three-year contract. Andersson made his Allsvenskan debut on April 10, 2016 in a 2-1 loss against Djurgårdens IF.

In January 2017, Andersson was loaned out to Allsvenskan club Östersunds FK. In January 2018, he signed a three-year contract with the club. On January 29, 2019, Andersson was recruited by Dalkurd FF. After the 2019 season, he left the club.

On 1 February 2020, Andersson was recruited by GIF Sundsvall, where he signed a three-year contract.

References

External links 
 
 

Swedish footballers
Allsvenskan players
1991 births
Living people
IF Elfsborg players
FC Trollhättan players
Ljungskile SK players
IK Sirius Fotboll players
Gefle IF players
Östersunds FK players
Dalkurd FF players
GIF Sundsvall players
Association football goalkeepers
People from Borås
Sportspeople from Västra Götaland County